Lintzgarth is a village in County Durham, in England. It is situated to the west of Rookhope.

The Lintzgarth smeltmill was built in 1737 and was used for smelting lead by all of the leadmines in the Rookhope valley. The poisonous fumes from the smelt mill were taken along a  flue and emitted from a chimney on Redburn Common.

References

External links

Villages in County Durham
Stanhope, County Durham